Juan Du is an architect and professor of architecture. She is professor and dean at the John H. Daniels Faculty of Architecture, Landscape, and Design at the University of Toronto. She previously taught at Hong Kong University and maintains a private architecture practice IDU. In 2020, she published The Shenzhen Experiment, examining the historically contingent factors that influenced the city’s development.

Education 
Du earned a bachelor’s degree from the University of Florida, a master of architecture at Princeton University, then a doctorate of science in architecture from ETH Zurich.

Career 
In 2006, Du established her own architecture practice, IDU. She also joined Hong Kong University, where she taught until 2021.

In 2010, Du curated Quotidian Architectures, Hong Kong's contribution to the Venice Biennale of Architecture, “exploring the relationship between collaborative design and socially and environmentally responsible architecture”.

In 2020, Du published The Shenzhen Experiment (Harvard University Press), which emphasizes contingent factors like history, ecology, politics, culture, and people in the success of the city, rather than resulting strictly from top-down planning. The book identifies and rebuts misconceptions about the timeline of the city’s development (well under way before Shenzhen became a Special Economic Zone (SEZ) in 1979); its population growth; and the goal of the SEZ (not to make China rich, Du argues, but to bring the country out of poverty). Reviewing the book in The China Quarterly, Denise Y. Ho writes, “In the sections that put Du's training as an architect and a planner on full display, The Shenzhen Experiment shines. […] Du's experience allows her to unpack not only the technicality of building and construction, but also its intricate politics, from the motivations behind the workers to the interests of municipal leaders.”

In July 2021, she became professor and dean at the John H. Daniels Faculty of Architecture, Landscape, and Design at the University of Toronto.

References

University of Florida alumni
Princeton University alumni
ETH Zurich alumni
Academic staff of the University of Toronto
Living people
Date of birth missing (living people)
Year of birth missing (living people)